Procolophoninae is an extinct subfamily of procolophonid parareptiles from the late Early Triassic to the early Middle Triassic (Olenekian and Anisian stages) of Africa, Antarctica, Asia, Europe and South America. Currently, the oldest-known procolophonine is Procolophon from the earliest Olenekian stage.

Phylogeny 
Procolophoninae was named in 1890 by Richard Lydekker. It is a stem-based taxon defined phylogenetically for the first time by Modesto et al. (2002) as "all taxa more related to Procolophon trigoniceps Owen, 1876 than to Leptopleuron lacertinum Owen, 1851". The cladogram below follows Ruta et al. 2011.

References

Procolophonines
Early Triassic reptiles
Middle Triassic reptiles
Late Triassic reptiles
Prehistoric reptiles of Antarctica
Triassic reptiles of Asia
Triassic reptiles of Europe
Early Triassic reptiles of Africa
Middle Triassic reptiles of Africa
Late Triassic reptiles of Africa
Early Triassic reptiles of South America
Middle Triassic reptiles of South America
Late Triassic reptiles of South America
Early Triassic first appearances
Middle Triassic extinctions